Minhanglu is a metro station of Zhengzhou Metro Line 1.

Station layout 
The station has 2 levels underground. The B1 level is for the station concourse where the customer service center, ticket vending machines and security checks are located. The single island platform for Line 1 is on the B2 level.

Exits

Surroundings
Jianguo Hotel (建国饭店)
Henan High Court (河南省高级人民法院)
Mingmen City Plaza (名门城市广场)

References

Stations of Zhengzhou Metro
Line 1, Zhengzhou Metro
Railway stations in China opened in 2013